Agathon Marie René de La Bintinaye (24 March 1758- December 1792) was a French naval officer, known for being central in the victory on 7 October 1779, near the island of Ouessant off the coast of Brittany, of his frigate La Surveillante over the British frigate HMS Quebec, 6 October 1779. The incident occurred during the English channel skirmishes of the Anglo-French war (1778-1783). He lost an arm during the combat. He emigrated to England in 1790 due to the French Revolution, renouncing his pension. He died in London.

References

1758 births
1792 deaths
French sailors